The Adam Joseph Lewis Center for Environmental Studies, located on the campus of Oberlin College, is an environmentally friendly building in Oberlin College. It was completed in 2000.

References

Further reading

School buildings completed in 2000
Low-energy building
Oberlin College
Buildings and structures in Lorain County, Ohio
University and college academic buildings in the United States
Sustainable buildings in the United States
2000 establishments in Ohio